Renata Viganò (1900–1976) was an Italian writer best known for her neo-realist novel L'Agnese va a morire, published in 1949. Viganò was an active participant in the Italian Resistance movement during World War II and featured fictionalized accounts of her experiences as a partisan in her written work.

Life

Viganò was born in Bologna on 17 June 1900. As an adolescent, she published two books of poetry, Ginestra in fiore (1912) and Piccola fiamma (1915). 

Vigano was a member of the Italian Communist Party. During World War II, she participated in the resistance as a nurse and courier in Emilia-Romagna. Together with her husband Antonio Meluschi, she helped organize armed resistance activities in the Po Valley.

Viganò published several novels in the postwar period, including L'Agnese va a morire (1949). L'Agnese tells the story of a washerwoman living in the countryside who joins the Communist resistance. The book became popular among Italian Communists at the time and established Viganò's position as a literary figure in the community. L'Agnese won the Italian Viareggio Prize and was adapted into a film of the same name in 1976 by Giuliano Montaldo. 

In addition to L'Agnese, much of Viganò's other work also focuses on themes of labor, resistance, and women's role in Italian society. Viganò wrote two collections of short stories (including Matrimonio in brigata, 1976, published in English as Partisan Wedding) and a reference volume about women who participated in the resistance (Donne nella Resistenza). Viganò also worked as a journalist, contributing to L'Unità, Rinascita, Corriere Padano, and Noi donne.

In the post-war period, his house in via Mascarella in Bologna was frequented by intellectuals such as Pier Paolo Pasolini, Sibilla Aleramo,  and Nella Nobili, former partisans and students.

From 1951 to 1955, she wrote an advice column for Noi donne on topics related to womanhood and motherhood aimed at leftist women. In 1952, Viganò published Mondine, a collection of personal essays about the so-called female mondina workers and the struggle to improve their conditions.

Viganò died in Bologna on 23 April 1976. In 2018, the city of Bologna in collaboration with ANPI erected a plaque commemorating the longtime home of Viganò and her husband.

Works 
Ginestra in fiore, 1913
Piccola flamma, 1916
Il lume spento, 1933
L'Agnese va a morire, 1949
Mondine, 1952
Arriva la cicogna, 1954
Donne della Resistenza, 1955
Ho conosciuto Ciro, 1959
Una storia di ragazze, 1962
Matrimonio in brigata, 1976; English translation published 1999
Rosario, 1984 (posthumous)

References 

Italian anti-fascists
1900 births
1976 deaths
20th-century Italian women writers
Writers from Bologna
Socialist feminists
Female anti-fascists